The Marion County Record is a weekly newspaper published in Marion, Kansas, and serves as the official newspaper of City of Marion and Marion County.  The paper publishes every Wednesday.

History

Origins
The newspaper's first issue came off the press on September 24, 1869, just six months after Ulysses S. Grant had replaced Andrew Johnson as president and only eight years after Kansas had become a state.  Founding editor and publisher A.W. Robinson called the paper The Western News, and it was initially printed 57 miles away in Detroit, in adjoining Dickinson County.

The paper moved to Marion Centre in 1870 because of a community effort by J.N. Rogers, J.H. Costello, A.E. Case, Levi Billings, William H. Billings and A.A. Moore, who offered Robinson cash to relocate. Robinson's first editorial effort was to encourage better sidewalks on Main Street. He remained publisher for 19 months.

John E. Murphy purchased the paper and renamed it The Western Giant. He sold it five months later to C.S. Triplett, who in 1871 changed the name to Marion County Record. After three years, Triplett sold the paper in 1874 to Edward W. Hoch, who had learned the printing trade at the short-lived Florence Pioneer, located in Florence, before moving to Marion.

Family ownership
Since 1874, two families have been involved with the Record. The Hoch family owned it for 124 years. The Meyer family has been involved for more than 60 years.

E.W. Hoch ran the newspaper until his death in 1925. Son Wallis Hoch and grandson Wharton Hoch also served as editors. E.W. Hoch and another of his sons, Homer Hoch, were active in politics. E.W., a legislator from 1889 to 1891 and from 1893 to 1895, served two terms as Kansas governor from 1905 to 1909. A lawyer by training, Homer served as a member of Congress from 1919 to 1933 and as a justice of the Kansas Supreme Court from 1938 until his death in 1949.

During the Hoch family's tenure, several other newspapers were folded into the Record — or simply folded. Eighteen separate newspapers were published in Marion, each for fewer than two years, between 1880 and 1895. The Marion Times, founded in 1890 by C.E. Foote and Henry Kuhn, became the Marion Headlight in 1899 when J.J. Buschlen purchased it. Buschlen sold the paper to the Record in 1909.

The Marion Review, founded by D.O. Bell as the Lincolnville Lance in 1907, became the Marion County Lance, moved to Marion in 1908, and changed its name to the Marion Review. C.C. Jones was the Review’s first publisher. Mr. and Mrs. T.B. Matlock, Mr. and Mrs. Burton Smith, and Mr. and Mrs. John Riddle followed him as publishers until, in May 1944, the Record and the Review merged to become the Marion Record-Review.

Wharton Hoch, who had taken over as editor of the Record in 1944, purchased the Riddle interest in May 1948. Three months later, Bill Meyer joined the staff as associate editor. In October 1957, the paper's name was changed back to Marion County Record. Meyer became editor after Hoch's death in 1967. He and his wife, Joan W. Meyer, and son, Eric K. Meyer, a journalism professor at the University of Illinois, purchased the newspaper from Wharton Hoch's estate in 1998. Bill Meyer died in 2006. Joan Meyer, who continues to compile the Record’s popular "Memories" column, is the newspaper's most senior staff member. She has worked at the Record for more than 50 years. Eric Meyer serves as publisher and president of the parent corporation, Hoch Publishing Co. Inc.

Donna Bernhardt, who remains a member of the board of directors along with longtime employee Melvin Honeyfield, became editor after Bill Meyer's retirement in 2003. Susan Berg, now Marion County treasurer, succeeded her as managing editor in 2008. After a series of news editors, including Adam Stewart, David Colburn, Sheila Kelley, and Mindy Kepfield, Eric Meyer assumed the role of editor after his retirement from Illinois in 2021. Other current staff members include reporters Deb Gruver, Nicholas Kimball, Rowena Plett, Phyllis Zorn, and Ryan Richter; sales manager Debra Steele; office manager Cheri Bentz; contributing writers Pat Wick and Delbert Peters; and distribution coordinators Beverly Baldwin and Barb Creamer.

Present status
The Record is the oldest publication in Marion County by only a small margin. The Peabody Gazette-Bulletin (website), which the Record purchased in 2001, is 3 years younger. The Record purchased the Hillsboro Star-Journal (website), in 1999.

The Record, with the largest paid circulation and largest news staff in Marion County, is a community newspaper serving as the official newspaper for the county and city of Marion.  The Peabody and Hillsboro newspapers are the official newspapers for their communities. A free-distribution publication, the Hillsboro Free Press, also is distributed in the county.

Online, both Quantcast and Compete rank the Record first, Star-Journal second, Gazette-Bulletin third and Free Press fourth most popular news sites in the county. URLMetric ranks the Record and Star-Journal first and second, respectively, but trades positions of the Free Press and Gazette-Bulletin in third and fourth place. The three Hoch Publishing websites require payment for complete access; the Free Press website does not.

Accomplishments
Three of the newspaper's former editors were members of the Kansas Newspaper Hall of Fame:
 Edward Hoch, 17th Governor of Kansas and namesake of Hoch Auditoria at the University of Kansas, was inducted in 1932.
 Wharton Hoch, his grandson, was inducted in 1974.
 Bill Meyer, only the second living inductee in history, was inducted in 2003, a year after he won the prestigious Eugene Cervi Award for Lifetime Achievement from the International Society of Weekly Newspaper Editors.

Over the years, the newspaper has won numerous awards from the Kansas Press Association, National Newspaper Association and various trade and industry associations. It twice won the national Edward Arnold Award for outstanding newspaper design. As editor, Meyer won virtually every statewide journalism award available: for public service, for mentoring and for lifetime achievement as a master editor.

Editorially, the newspaper was instrumental in building or preserving numerous public improvements, including Marion Elementary School, Marion Reservoir, Marion's dike and levy, Marion County Hospital District No. 1 (which operates St. Luke Hospital), the Hill School on the National Register of Historic Places, Butler Community College of Marion, Warrior Stadium in Marion and Marion Public Library.

See also

The other newspapers in Marion County are Hillsboro Free Press, Hillsboro Star-Journal, Peabody Gazette-Bulletin.

References

External links
 
 1916 History of Early Marion County Newspapers

Weekly newspapers published in the United States
Newspapers published in Kansas
Marion County, Kansas